Don't Mess Up My Tempo (stylized in all caps) is the fifth studio album by South Korean–Chinese boy band Exo. It was released on November 2, 2018 by SM Entertainment. Member Lay is featured in the Chinese version of lead track, "Tempo", marking his first appearance with the group since Winter EP, For Life (2016). It is available in four versions: Allegro, Moderato, Andante and Vivace, named after types of tempo. The album debuted at number one on the Gaon Album Chart. The album was repackaged as Love Shot on December 13, 2018.

Background and release
Don't Mess Up My Tempo is the band's fifth Korean studio album and sixth overall. It follows the band's first Japanese studio album Countdown, released in January 2018; their previous Korean release was the EP Universe, released in December 2017. It was announced in October 2018 that the album is the band's first since Ex'Act in 2016 (and its repackage Lotto) to feature Lay, who has focused on his own singing and acting career in China. Lay participated in recording the Mandarin version of the lead single "Tempo", and also appears in its music video.

On October 21, a 30-second Tempo Concept short film teaser was released through their social media accounts, depicting them as a biker gang, and playing a short audio snippet of the album's lead single "Tempo", which Billboard describes as "starting off with a dramatic synth melody, pulsating beat and the phrase 'I can't believe.'" The group's social media accounts updated their avatars to red cube icons, and revealed a poster with a caption that reads: "Speed loving bikers enter the fragment of frozen time as they log into the red cube. Solving the given puzzle is the only route for all to escape. However, the bikers are unable to resist the temptation and reenter the cube."

The caption also appeared in the interactive puzzle game "Circuit Exo", created for the promotional period which, consistent with the comeback concept, showing a motorcycle running around a mini car track formed as "EXO". In order to stop the motorcycle, fans were asked to enter the jersey number of the EXO member whose teaser has been released that day. Upon entering the correct number, the motorcycle stopped and a red cube appeared to hover above it, and clicking on it revealed exclusive teaser images.

SM Entertainment began releasing teasers on October 22 through Exo's official social media accounts. Further details about the album were also revealed on October 23, with the design and content of the three versions being released. On October 31, the "Tempo" music video teaser was released alongside two posters: one featuring all nine members of the group, as well as one containing only the text "End = Beginning". The album and its title track's Korean music video were released on November 2 both digitally and physically. The Chinese music video was released several hours later.

On November 11, 2018, it was announced by Kai and Suho that the album would be repackaged without Lay. The title of the repackaged album, Love Shot, was revealed on December 3. SM Entertainment began releasing teasers from December 6 through Exo's official social media accounts. The repackaged album and its title track's music video were released on December 13, 2018.

Music
Don't Mess Up My Tempo features eleven songs of different genres. The title track "Tempo" is described as hip-hop leaning dance track which showcases a cappella harmonies with lyrics that warn not to "mess up his tempo" with a lover.

"Sign" is an electropop track with an intense bass and "bombastic" groove with lyrics expressing a man's growing doubt due to lies told by the woman he loves. The third song "Ooh La La La" is a Latin pop song, combining a heavy 808 bass and an "exotic" atmosphere of Spanish guitar. The lyrics of the song are about imagined love when two people accidentally make eye contact. "Gravity" is characterized as an electropop track with a retro sound and funky rhythm, which the British duo LDN Noise worked on. The lyrics were co-written by member Chanyeol, and are described as about the desire to capture a girl's attention with gravity and charm.

"With You" is described as an R&B and pop track with a "bright" synthesizer and electro-trap elements. Member Chanyeol participated in writing and composing the song. The lyrics are about growing to like someone more when one spends more time with them. "24/7" is a midtempo song with a modern sound and memorable catchy phrases. Kenzie participated in writing the lyrics, which express complex emotions after one says "cold words" to their lover. "Bad Dream" is characterized as an uptempo R&B song, where the "sophisticated" guitar riff and poppy synthesizer's dynamic melody line go well together with lyrics about one thinking about their past lover alone at night, with comparisons to a storm.

"Damage" is a hip hop and dance song with a bass-heavy and reggae rhythm, with its lyrics expressing the "cold" reaction one has after getting hurt by their lover, and giving back the pain they experienced like a "sudden flash of lightning", while "Smile On My Face" is described as an R&B ballad with soft melodies and simple yet "sophisticated" grooves, with lyrics about healing one's own pain after a breakup, smiling and "letting their love go". The last song "Oasis" is an elliptical pop song with a combination of staccato piano and strings, heavy 808 bass, and a grand harmony.

Love Shot features four new songs, including the title track "Love Shot" (in Korean and Chinese) which is described as a pop dance track that features a memorably addictive chorus and heavy 808 bass. Members Chen and Chanyeol participated in writing the lyrics that talk about hoping to be together and rediscover the meaning of true love, which seems to be disappearing more and more from a dreary world.

"Trauma" is an upbeat pop dance song with lyrics expressing the intention to overcome the pain one feels, while "Wait" is described as an R&B ballad with an acoustic guitar melody and harmonizes with the members' vocals.

Promotion
On November 1, Exo held a press conference where they gave a pre-listening session for Don’t Mess Up My Tempo and talked about their comeback, the album making, and the pre-sales surpassing 1.1 million. Exo began promoting lead single "Tempo" and "Ooh La La La" on South Korean music programs on November 2. On the same day, the group held a live showcase at Paradise City in Incheon where they talked about their album and performed four songs, "Ooh La La La", "Smile On My Face", "24/7", and "Tempo".

On November 10, Exo held a fansign event at the SMTown COEXartium, and a second fansign event on November 16 at the GLAD Hotel Grand Ballroom. The third fansign was held Gangnam at the White Hall Art Theater on November 18.

Exo had their first music show performance for the lead single of the repackaged album on December 14. One day later, the group held a fansign in Seocho at the White Wave Art Center. On December 20, EXO held a fan event called 0xFESTA by SK Telecom where they performed "Tempo", "24/7", "Love Shot", and "Wait". The last fansign for Love Shot was held in Samseong-dong on December 21.

Commercial performance
On October 31, 2018, 28 days after the opening of pre-orders, it was announced that Don't Mess Up My Tempo had exceeded 1.1 million pre-orders. The album went on to debut at number one on the Gaon Album Chart for the week of November 3, 2018.  As of November 11, the album had sold 1,179,997 million copies, officially making Exo a quintuple million-selling group, and the first act in South Korea to sell over 10,000,000+ copies cumulatively across all albums. It eventually became the top-selling album of November 2018 on Gaon Album Chart with a total of 1,195,334 sales. The album was certified "Million" by Gaon on January 10, 2019.

The album also attained international success by debuting at number 23 on the US Billboard 200, making it Exo's highest-charting album in the United States. It achieved 23,000 album-equivalent units, including 19,000 pure album sales. Exo became the third K-pop group to have an album chart in the top 40 of the US Billboard 200.

The repackaged album debuted at number one on the Gaon Album Chart for the week of December 15, 2018. Additionally, it peaked at number 8 on the Billboard World Albums Chart and number 3 on the Oricon Chart in Japan. In February, the album was received a Double Platinum KMCA cerification.

Awards and nominations

Track listing
Credits adapted from Spotify, Apple Music and Naver.

Charts

Weekly charts

Year-end charts

Sales

Certifications and sales

Release history

See also
 List of best-selling albums in China
 List of best-selling albums in South Korea
 List of K-pop songs on the Billboard charts
 List of K-pop albums on the Billboard charts
 List of Gaon Album Chart number ones of 2018

References

2018 albums
Exo albums
SM Entertainment albums
Korean-language albums
IRiver albums